Ministry of Labor and Social Affairs (established in 1957) is a ministry of Federal Democratic Republic of Ethiopia since 1957. Its name changed time to time following the systems of ruling government. Until the ministry got its current name in 1977, it has a name called Ministry of Community Development, and Ministry of Community Development and Social Affairs respectively. All the name of ministry had given by the proclamation.

History 

Ministry of Labor and Social Affairs is established in 1957 by the proclamation number 15 as a Ministry of Community Development during the reign-ship of Haile Selassie, and this name stayed for nearly a decade and renamed to the Ministry of Community Development and Social Affairs in 1966 by proclamation number 46.

In 1977, during the derg regime, the ministry was named the Ministry of Labor and Social Affairs. It is under the leadership of Ergoge Tesfaye since 16 October 2018. The ministry has two main sections, named Labor Affairs, and Social Affairs; the latter has two directorates, Employment and Peaceful Industrial Relation Directorate and Overseas Employment and Workers Safety Protection Directorate.

List of ministries

References 

1957 establishments in Ethiopia
Government ministries of Ethiopia
Ministry of Labor and Social Affairs of Ethiopia